Yuri Nikolaevich Klepikov  (24 August 1935 – 1 November 2021) was a Russian screenwriter and actor. He had written for twelve films since 1966. He was a member of the jury at the 41st Berlin International Film Festival.

Selected filmography

Scriptwriter
 The Story of Asya Klyachina (1966)
 The Seventh Companion (1967)
 Mama Married (1969)
 About Love (1970)
 Dauria (1971)
 The Ascent (1976)
 Boys (1983)

Actor
 Nachalo (1970) as Fyodor Vasilievich Ignatyev, chief director
 The Romanovs: An Imperial Family'' (2000) as General Lavr Kornilov

References

External links

1935 births
2021 deaths
Writers from Chelyabinsk
Soviet screenwriters
20th-century Russian screenwriters
20th-century Russian male writers
Male screenwriters
Russian male writers
Soviet male film actors
Russian male film actors
Recipients of the Nika Award